Všejany is a municipality and village in Mladá Boleslav District in the Central Bohemian Region of the Czech Republic. It has about 700 inhabitants.

Administrative parts
The village of Vanovice is an administrative part of Všejany.

Geography
It lies on the border between the Central Elbe Table and Jizera Table. The Vlkava River flows through the municipality.

History
The first written mention of Všejany is from 1382.

Transport
Všejany is located on the railway line Mladá Boleslav–Nymburk.

Sights
The landmark of Všejany is the Church of Saint John the Baptist. It is originally a Gothic church, rebuilt in the Baroque style.

References

External links

Villages in Mladá Boleslav District